Gamperaliya is a 1963 Sri Lankan drama film directed by Dr. Lester James Peries screenplay, dialogue and the script by Reggie Siriwardena and Tissa Abeysekara; it was adapted from the novel Gamperaliya by Martin Wickramasinghe. The film starts ensemble cast of several eras together including, Henry Jayasena, Punya Heendeniya, Wickrama Bogoda, Trilicia Gunawardena and Gamini Fonseka.

The film was groundbreaking in Sinhala cinema shot entirely outside of a studio using one lamp and hand held lights for lighting. The movie exemplifies Peries's use of family tensions to symbolize wider issues.

The film was internationally acclaimed, receiving the Golden Peacock (Best Film) at the 3rd International Film Festival of India and the Golden Head of Palenque in Mexico. The film won the Best Director and Best Film awards at the 1965 Sarasaviya Film Festival. It was entered into the 3rd Moscow International Film Festival. It was shown in Cannes Film festival in May 2008 under the French title Changement au village under section 'Restored Classics'. Subsequently it went out on general release in French cinemas. In 2001, the film was identified as a world heritage by Cinema Thek Institute (CTI) in France.

Plot 
Piyal (Henry Jayasena) is a handsome young teacher who is hired to teach English to Nanda (Punya Heendeniya), a member of an eminent family. They fall in love, but can not marry because Piyal is of a lower class. Nanda's parents instead push her into a marriage with Jinadasa (Gamini Fonseka), who is of the same class as them. With economic downturn in Sri Lanka, both families lose their status and Jinadasa leaves to try to make a better life for himself; he never achieves his goal and dies penniless. Piyal and Nanda can now finally come together. They have changed; the earlier idyllic nature of their relationship is not recaptured.

Cast

Production 
Lester James Peries admired Martin Wickramsinghe's work and was inspired to attempt an adaption of Wickramasinghe's novel Gamperaliya into a movie in 1964. Wickremasinghe was initially reluctant thinking it wouldn't make a good movie, but eventually agreed.  Scholar Regie Siriwardene was asked to script the film.

Reception 
Playwright Ediriweera Sarachchandra championed the film writing "At last a Sinhalese film has been made which we could show the world without having to hide our heads in shame. I want to say a great film has been made of a great novel." British director Lindsay Anderson hailed "its elegiac, near-Chekhovian grace."

References

External links

1963 films
1963 drama films
Films directed by Lester James Peries
1960s Sinhala-language films
Films based on Sri Lankan novels
Films set in Sri Lanka (1948–present)
Films based on works by Martin Wickramasinghe
Sri Lankan drama films